tRNA-splicing endonuclease subunit Sen34 is an enzyme that in humans is encoded by the TSEN34 gene.

tRNA splicing is a fundamental process required for cell growth and division. SEN34 is a subunit of the tRNA splicing endonuclease, which catalyzes the removal of introns, the first step in tRNA splicing (Paushkin et al., 2004).[supplied by OMIM]

Interactions
TSEN34 has been shown to interact with TSEN2.

References

Further reading

External links
 GeneReviews/NCBI/NIH/UW entry on Pontocerebellar Hypoplasia Type 2 and Type 4